Captain My Captain is the second and final studio album by the pioneering American queercore band Team Dresch. The album was released on June 4, 1996, by Chainsaw Records and Candy Ass Records. It was reissued in 2019 by Jealous Butcher Records, to coincide with a 25th anniversary reunion tour.

Recording
Captain My Captain was recorded in November 1995 at John and Stu's Place in Seattle, Washington and produced by John Goodmanson. Singer and guitarist Jody Bleyle stated that a lot of her writing on the album had to do with a "physical and emotional breakdown" she had before its recording. At the time, she recalled that the band's focus on politics and self-defense went "far beyond being an obsession", especially during an eight-week tour to support the Free to Fight project.

Reception

Although Captain My Captain received positive reviews from critics, it was generally considered inferior to its predecessor, Personal Best.

Track listing
"Uncle Phranc" – 3:23
"107" – 4:05
"My Dirty Hands are Mined" – 3:00
"The Council" – 3:20
"Don't Try Suicide" – 3:11
"To the Enemies of Political Rock" – 2:26
"Take on Me" – 1:59
"Yes I Am Too But Who Am I Really?" – 2:50
"I'm Illegal" – 2:32
"Musical Fanzine" – 3:51
"Remember Who You Are" – 8:19

References

External links

1996 albums
Team Dresch albums